More Perfect Union is a 1987 release by Arizona heavy metal band Icon. The album, initially released on cassette only, featured a Capitol Records logo like their previous two major label albums, but was in essence an independent release as guitarist Dan Wexler states that, "We lost the deal from Capitol in October/November 1985." After losing the deal and frontman Stephen Clifford, the band played a few shows with new singer Steven Young. However, before starting work on this album, he was replaced by Jerry Harrison, as guitarist John Aquilino was replaced by keyboardist Kevin Stoller, known for his work with Stevie Nicks among others. The cassette originally contained ten tracks, sold out quickly and became a sought-after collectible due to the band's worldwide cult status. Due to fan demand, the album was re-released in 1995 on CD with the title An Even More Perfect Union and included seven bonus tracks, selling initially as a limited numbered edition autographed by Dan Wexler. The later printings are easily identified as they have the logo and title in a different color.

Track listing

Personnel
Band members
Jerry Harrison - vocals
Dan Wexler - guitars
Kevin Stoller - keyboards, synthesizers
Tracy Wallach - bass, backing vocals
Pat Dixon - drums, electronic drums

Additional musicians
Mark Prentice - keyboards
Mark Seagraves - keyboard programming
John Aquilino - guitars
Steven Escallier - tambourine, handclaps

Production
Mixed at Chaton Studios, Phoenix, Arizona and Prairie Sun Studios, Cotati, California
Produced by Dan Wexler and Steve Escallier
Arranged by: Pat Dixon, Dan Wexler, Jerry Harrison & Tracy Wallach
Additional engineering: Andy Seagle, Bob Frasier
Remixed by: Dan Wexler
Coordinator: Nu Media Music Film, S. "Tito" Bombaci

References

1987 albums
Icon (band) albums